

1986

See also 
 1986 in Australia
 1986 in Australian television

References

External links 
 Australian film at the Internet Movie Database

1986
Lists of 1986 films by country or language
Films